Top of the World Provincial Park is a provincial park in British Columbia, Canada.

External links
 Top of the World at BC Parks

Provincial parks of British Columbia
Parks in the Regional District of East Kootenay